This is a list of all rhubarb cultivars. Varieties are not included on this list. The formal cultivar name of rhubarb cultivars will always be Rheum × hybridum 'Cultivar name' (for example: Rheum × hybridum 'Grandad's Favorite').

Rhubarb cultivars

References 

Rhubarb
rhubarb